Elections to Trafford Council were held on Thursday, 3 May 1979, on the same day as the 1979 UK General Election.  One third of the council was up for election, with each successful candidate to serve a four-year term of office, expiring in 1983. The Conservative Party retained overall control of the council.

After the election, the composition of the council was as follows:

Ward results

References

1979 English local elections
1979
1970s in Greater Manchester